Carola Braunbock (1924–1978) was a Bohemian-born East German stage, television and film actress. She was born to an ethnically German family in the newly created Czechoslovakia.

Selected filmography
 Man of Straw (1951)
 Goods for Catalonia (1959)
 Kein Ärger mit Cleopatra (1961)
 Follow Me, Scoundrels (1964)
 Bread and Roses (1967)
 Three Wishes for Cinderella (1973)

References

Bibliography
 Eric Rentschler. German Film & Literature. Routledge, 2013.

External links

1924 births
1978 deaths
German film actresses
German stage actresses
German television actresses
Actors from Plzeň
German Bohemian people
People from Plzeň-North District
Sudeten German people